The following lists events that happened during 1934 in the Union of Soviet Socialist Republics.

Incumbents
 General Secretary of the Communist Party of the Soviet Union – Joseph Stalin 
 Chairman of the Central Executive Committee of the Congress of Soviets – Mikhail Kalinin 
 Chairman of the Council of People's Commissars of the Soviet Union – Vyacheslav Molotov

Events
 26 Jan–10 Feb – 17th Congress of the All-Union Communist Party (Bolsheviks)
 18 September – Soviet Union joins the League of Nations as a permanent Board member

Undated
 Plans for the new T-34 tank are first drawn up
 Second Five Year plan underway

Publications

Births
 7 January – Viktor Pavlovich Potapov, military officer (d. 2021)
 9 March – Yuri Gagarin, first man in space (d. 1968)
 7 April – Lev Anninsky, Russian literary critic, historian and screenwriter (d. 2019)
 8 May – Anastasiya Kobzarenko, librarian
 29 August – Gennady Kazmin, politician (d. 2018)
 4 September – Eduard Khil, baritone (d. 2012)
 16 September – Tamara Manina, artistic gymnast
 8 December – Alisa Freindlich, actress

Deaths
 6 July – Nestor Makhno, anarchist, in exile (b. 1888)
 1 December – Sergei Kirov, Bolshevik revolutionary and politician, assassinated (b. 1886)

References

See also
 1934 in fine arts of the Soviet Union
 List of Soviet films of 1934
 T-34
 Soviet Union

 
1930s in the Soviet Union